Elizabeth Tripp née Leigh (1809-1899) was an Australian educator. She was the founder and manager of one of the first lasting schools for girls in Melbourne the East Leigh in Melbourne, between 1859 and 1881.

Tripp was born to the jurist William Leigh in Devonshire in England. In 1831, she married her cousin, the lawyer William Upton Tripp (d. 1873), with whom she had five daughters and a son. She emigrated to Australia with her family in 1850.

In 1859, she separated from her spouse, and opened a school for girls in Melbourne with the help of her daughters. From the 1850s onward, it was common for an educated woman in Melbourne to open a school for girls, but normally, these schools were only a temporary method for self-support: the East Leigh was the first girls school in Melbourne to become a successful and permanent educational institution and was as such a pioneer institution. First only assisted by her daughters, Tripp was soon able to engage professional teachers.

Tripp was also a successful businessperson within the stock market.

Tripp died at her home, 12 Bruce Street, Toorak, on 25 September 1899. Her funeral was held at St. John's Church, Toorak, with burial at the Melbourne General Cemetery.

References

 Marjorie R. Theobald: Knowing Women: Origins of Women's Education in Nineteenth-Century Australia

1809 births
1899 deaths
19th-century Australian businesswomen
19th-century Australian businesspeople
19th-century Australian educators
19th century in Melbourne
Defunct girls' schools in Australia
Burials at Melbourne General Cemetery